Rossmore Island is a former island in County Kerry, now joined to the mainland via a bridge.

Demographics

Islands of County Kerry